Appliances Online is an online retailer for white goods and home appliances that is based in Sydney, Australia. The company is a subsidiary of the family-run Winning Group, which includes Winning Appliances, Winning Services and Home Clearance, all of which either sell or deliver major domestic appliances. The company claims to have served more than 1.7 million Australian customers nationwide.

History
Appliances Online was established in 2005 by John Winning. Appliances Online is an online retailer of appliances and white goods in Australia.
The company was founded as an online competitor to other electrical and white goods retailers. The company's target customer base are those who are limited on time and those who need a replacement.

Appliances Online has its own shipping service to the greater Sydney, Melbourne, Brisbane, Gold Coast, Perth, and Hunter regions. The company employs 150 people in its head office in Sydney and in its warehouses across Australia. In 2011, the average sale price on Appliances Online was $1000.

In December 2010, Appliances Online purchased the domain and website for Big Brown Box to act as a retail arm in the audio visual market. The Appliances Online warehouse in Brisbane allowed Winning Appliances to launch its first showroom in Queensland in August 2011. In March 2015, Big Brown Box was consolidated into Appliances Online, allowing the Appliances Online website to begin selling audio visual and consumer electronic products.

Motorsport
Appliances Online and Walkinshaw Andretti United partnership began in 2019 sponsoring the #22 Holden Commodore ZB of James Courtney.

In 2020 Appliances Online carried on their partnership with WAU now sponsoring the #25 Holden Commodore ZB of Chaz Mostert.

References

External links
Official website

 Consumer reviews
 Consumer feedback and reviews of service

Companies based in Sydney
Online retailers of Australia
Retail companies established in 2005
Privately held companies of Australia